The Railway Club was a society for railway enthusiasts.  It was formed in 1899.  The club provided regular meetings of general railway interest, and members had access to a club room and library located in London, UK.

Railway societies